The Al Fajer L-10 is a drone built by Start Aviation that can serve several civilian and military uses.

Type HALE (High Altitude Long Endurance-), it can fly at up to  altitude with an endurance of 36 hours.

See also
 Amel (UAV)
 AMEL 300-3
 AMEL 400-1
 AMEL 700-2
 Al Fajer L-10

References 

Algerian Air Force
2010s Algerian military aircraft